Anna Dorothea may refer to:
Anna Dorothea, Abbess of Quedlinburg (1657–1704), Princess-Abbess of Quedlinburg
Dorothea von Medem (1761–1821), Duchess of Courland